Human multitasking is the concept that one can split their attention on more than one task or activity at the same time, such as speaking on the phone while driving a car. Multitasking can result in time wasted due to human context switching and becoming prone to errors due to insufficient attention. If one becomes proficient at two tasks, it is possible to rapidly shift attention between the tasks and perform the tasks well.

Etymology
The first published use of the word "multitask" appeared in an IBM paper describing the capabilities of the IBM System/360 in 1965. The term has since been applied to human tasks.

Research
Since the 1960s, psychologists have conducted experiments on the nature and limits of human multitasking. The simplest experimental design used to investigate human multitasking is the so-called psychological refractory period effect. Here, people are asked to make separate responses to each of two stimuli presented close together in time. An extremely general finding is a slowing in responses to the second-appearing stimulus.

Researchers have long suggested that there appears to be a processing bottleneck preventing the brain from working on certain key aspects of both tasks at the same time (e.g.). Bottlenecking refers to the idea that because people only have a limited amount of attentional resources, the most important information is kept. Many researchers believe that the cognitive function subject to the most severe form of bottlenecking is the planning of actions and retrieval of information from memory. Psychiatrist Edward M. Hallowell has gone so far as to describe multitasking as a "mythical activity in which people believe they can perform two or more tasks simultaneously as effectively as one."

Others have researched multitasking in the area of learning. Richard E Mayer and Moreno[6] studied the phenomenon of cognitive load in multimedia learning and concluded that it is difficult, if not impossible, to learn new information while engaging in multitasking. Reynol Junco and Shelia R Cotten examined how multitasking affects academic success and found that students who engaged in high levels of multitasking reported significant issues with their academic work.[7] A more recent study on the effects of multitasking on academic performance showed that using Facebook and text messaging while studying were negatively related to student grades, while online searching and emailing were not.[8]

Some experiments have been done that demonstrate that it is possible to divide one's attention among several tasks, how successfully depends on several factors such as how much practice one has with it or the difficulty of the task. Walter Schneider and Robert Shiffrin performed an experiment in which they presented the participants with a memory set, which consists of target stimuli such as the number three. After being presented with the memory set they were rapidly shown 20 test frames which contained distractor stimuli. One of the slides they were shown contained one of the target stimuli from the memory set. With each trial, a new memory set and new test frames were presented. At the start of the experiment, participants averaged 55% in correctly identifying the target stimuli from the memory set. After 900 trials the participants were able to bring the average up to 90%. They reported that after about 600 trials the task became automatic and they were able to respond without thinking about it.

The brain's role 
Because the brain cannot fully focus when multitasking, people take longer to complete tasks and are predisposed to error. When people attempt to complete many tasks at one time, “or [alternate] rapidly between them, errors go way up, and it takes far longer—often double the time or more—to get the jobs done than if they were done sequentially,” states Meyer. This is largely because "the brain is compelled to restart and refocus". A study by Meyer and David Kieras found that in the interim between each exchange, the brain makes no progress whatsoever. Therefore, multitasking people not only perform each task less suitably, but lose time in the process.

According to a study done by Jordan Grafman, chief of the cognitive neuroscience section at the National Institute of Neurological Disorders and Stroke, "the most anterior part [of the brain] allows [a person] to leave something when it's incomplete and return to the same place and continue from there," while Brodmann Area 10, a part of the brain's frontal lobes, is important for establishing and attaining long-term goals. Focusing on multiple dissimilar tasks at once forces the brain to process all activity in its anterior. Though the brain is complex and can perform myriad tasks, it cannot multitask well.

Another study by René Marois, a psychologist at Vanderbilt University, discovered that the brain exhibits a "response selection bottleneck" when asked to perform several tasks at once. The brain must then decide which activity is most important, thereby taking more time. Psychologist David Meyer, of the University of Michigan, claims that instead of a "bottleneck," the brain experiences "adaptive executive control" which places priorities on each activity. These viewpoints differ in that while bottlenecking attempts to force many thoughts through the brain at once, adaptive executive control prioritizes tasks to maintain a semblance of order. The brain better understands this order and, as psychologists such as Dr. Meyer believe, can, therefore, be trained to multitask. It is not known exactly how the brain processes input and reacts to overstimulation.

Some research suggests that the human brain can be trained to multitask. A study published in Child Development by Monica Luciana, associate professor of psychology at the University of Minnesota, discovered that the brain's capability of categorizing competing information continues to develop until ages sixteen and seventeen. A study by Vanderbilt University found that multitasking is largely limited by "the speed with which our prefrontal cortex processes information." Paul E. Dux, the co-author of the study, believes that this process can become faster through proper training. The study trained seven people to perform two simple tasks, either separately or together, and conducted brain scans of the participants. The individuals multitasked poorly at first but, with training, were able to adeptly perform the tasks simultaneously. Brain scans of the participants indicate that the prefrontal cortex quickened its ability to process the information, enabling the individuals to multitask more efficiently. However, the study also suggests that the brain is incapable of performing multiple tasks at one time, even after extensive training. This study further indicates that, while the brain can become adept at processing and responding to certain information, it cannot truly multitask.

People have a limited ability to retain information, which worsens when the amount of information increases. For this reason, people alter information to make it more memorable, such as separating a ten-digit phone number into three smaller groups or dividing the alphabet into sets of three to five letters, a phenomenon known as chunking. George Miller, former psychologist at Harvard University, believes the limits to the human brain's capacity centers around "the number seven, plus or minus two." An illustrative example of this is a test in which a person must repeat numbers read aloud. While two or three numbers are easily repeated, fifteen numbers become more difficult. The person would, on average, repeat seven correctly. Brains are only capable of storing a limited amount of information in their short-term memories.

Laboratory-based studies of multi-tasking indicate that one motivation for switching between tasks is to increase the time spent on the task that produces the most reward (Payne, Duggan & Neth, 2007). This reward could be progress towards an overall task goal, or it could simply be the opportunity to pursue a more interesting or fun activity. Payne, Duggan, and Neth (2007) found that decisions to switch task reflected either the reward provided by the current task or the availability of a suitable opportunity to switch (i.e. the completion of a subgoal). A French fMRI study published in 2010 indicated preliminary support for the hypothesis that the brain can pursue at most two goals simultaneously, one for each frontal lobe (which has a goal-oriented area).

When studying the costs of multitasking there are typically two designs for or types of multitasking that are examined, task switching and dual tasking. Task switching involves shifting one’s attention from one thing to another. Dual tasking, on the other hand, is when attention is divided among multiple things at once. Studies have been done to specifically examine the brain when one is engaged in either type of multitasking. Through the use of MRI brain scans, researchers have found that frontoparietal regions are activated which would include the inferior frontal junction and the posterior parietal cortex. They also found that while each type of tasking uses different mechanisms there are also some underlying mechanisms and resources that they share.

Sex differences
There is little data available to support claims of a real sex difference. Most studies that do show any sex differences tend to find that the differences are small and inconsistent.

A recent study showed that there are not significant sex differences in multi-tasking across numerous tasks.

Or in 2018, a study in Norway tested everyday scenarios via videogames and found that "none of the multitasking measures (accuracy, total time, total distance covered by the avatar, a prospective memory score, and a distractor management score) showed any sex differences."

Controversial discussion continues as the lack of data available to support the popular belief does not prove it to be wrong.
There have been attempts to produce evolutionary explanations for the popular belief.
 
One theory that proposes an explanation for why there may be gender differences in multitasking is the hunter-gatherer theory proposed by Silverman and Eals in accordance with a multitasking experiment they conducted in 1992. Their hypothesis says that natural selection favored hunting-related skills and resulted in a difference in task performance for genders. (i.e., their theory states that men and women's cognitive abilities evolved differently based on the hunter-gatherer tasks they performed in the past.) 
Men focused on one task, hunting, while women were gatherers and took care of the children at home. The idea is that over time there was a natural selection for women who could multitask. We no longer have such rigid labor division, but the natural selection that took place in primitive societies is thought to have made modern females superior multitaskers.
In a study that looked at sex differences in spatial abilities in 40 countries, they found that men scored higher on tests of multidimensional mental rotations and women scored higher in object location memory, as the experimenters predicted.

In 2013, a brain connectivity study from Penn Medicine, funded by in part by the National Institutes of Mental Health, published in the Proceedings of the National Academy of Sciences found major differences in men and women's neural wiring that is leading researchers to believe in popular belief that sex plays a role in multitasking skills. It is believed that "[On] average, men are more likely better at learning and performing a single task at hand, like cycling or navigating directions, whereas women have superior memory and social cognition skills, making them more equipped for multitasking and creating solutions that work for a group." The full text of the study can be found on the PNAS website. However, this study has been widely criticized because the differences could easily have been caused by increased head movement. Moreover, the link between the DTI data and behavioral performance is speculative.

Continuous partial attention

Author Steven Berlin Johnson describes one kind of multitasking: “It usually involves skimming the surface of the incoming data, picking out the relevant details, and moving on to the next stream. You’re paying attention, but only partially. That lets you cast a wider net, but it also runs the risk of keeping you from really studying the fish." Multimedia pioneer Linda Stone coined the phrase "continuous partial attention" for this kind of processing. Continuous partial attention is multitasking where things do not get studied in depth.

Rapidly increasing technology fosters multitasking because it promotes multiple sources of input at a given time. Instead of exchanging old equipment like TV, print, and music, for new equipment such as computers, the Internet, and video games, children and teens combine forms of media and continually increase sources of input. According to studies by the Kaiser Family Foundation, in 1999 only 16 percent of time spent using media such as Internet, television, video games, telephones, text-messaging, or e-mail was combined. In 2005, 26 percent of the time these media were used together. This increase in simultaneous media usage decreases the amount of attention paid to each device. In 2005 it was found that 82 percent of American youth use the Internet by the seventh grade in school. A 2005 survey by the Kaiser Family Foundation found that, while their usage of media continued at a constant 6.5 hours per day, Americans ages 8 to 18 were crowding roughly 8.5 hours’ worth of media into their days due to multitasking. The survey showed that one quarter to one-third of the participants have more than one input “most of the time” while watching television, listening to music, or reading. The 2007 Harvard Business Review featured Linda Stone's idea of “continuous partial attention,” or, “constantly scanning for opportunities and staying on top of contacts, events, and activities in an effort to miss nothing”. As technology provides more distractions, attention is spread among tasks more thinly.

A prevalent example of this inattention to detail due to multitasking is apparent when people talk on cell phones while driving. One study found that having an accident is four times more likely when using a cell phone while driving. Another study compared reaction times for experienced drivers during a number of tasks, and found that the subjects reacted more slowly to brake lights and stop signs during phone conversations than during other simultaneous tasks. A 2006 study showed that drivers talking on cell phones were more involved in rear-end collisions and sped up slower than intoxicated drivers. When talking, people must withdraw their attention from the road in order to formulate responses. Because the brain cannot focus on two sources of input at one time, driving and listening or talking, constantly changing input provided by cell phones distracts the brain and increases the likelihood of accidents.

Supertasker 
In 2010, a scientific study found that a small percent of the population appeared to be much better at multitasking than others, and these people were subsequently labeled "supertaskers". In 2015, another study supported the idea of supertaskers. This particular study showed that they tested people by making them drive on a driving simulator while at the same time memorizing words and solving math problems. As expected, most of the participants did much worse than their individual task test scores. The supertaskers, however, were able to multitask without major effects to their performance.

Popular commentary on practical multitasking
Barry Schwartz has noted that, given the media-rich landscape of the Internet era, it is tempting to get into a habit of dwelling in a constant sea of information with too many choices, which has been noted to have a negative effect on human happiness.

Observers of youth in modern society often comment upon the apparently advanced multitasking capabilities of the youngest generations of humans (Generation Y and Generation Z). While it is true that contemporary researchers find that youths in today's world exhibit high levels of multitasking, most experts believe that members of the Net Generation are not any better at multitasking than members of older generations. However, recent studies by Bardhi, Rohm, and Sultan argue that Generation Y is becoming better at media multitasking. Media multitasking is when media consumers view several media platforms at the same time; such as watching TV while browsing the internet. This is evidenced by the fact that they are gaining control over deciding which messages they pay attention to or not. Nonetheless, while there is a great deal of evidence showing the negative effects of multitasking on cognitive tasks, there is no evidence showing that multitasking has a positive or neutral effect on these tasks.

Many studies, literature, articles, and worldwide consulting firms, stress the fact that multitasking of any kind reduces the productivity and/or increases rate of errors, thus generating unnecessary frustrations.

In 2008, it was estimated that $650 billion a year is wasted in US businesses due to multitasking.

See also
 Absent-mindedness
 Attention management
 Crossmodal attention
 Directed attention fatigue
 Human reliability
 Media multitasking
 Multi-boxing
 Ovsiankina effect
 Pareto principle
 Parkinson's Law
 Polychronicity
 Task switching (psychology)
 Time management

References

Further reading
 
 Multitaskers bad at multitasking – BBC News Monday, August 24, 2009
   - The Problems With Multitasking
  – The Multitasking Virus and the End of Learning?

External links

 
 
 

Neuropsychology
Attention